Shangri-La's Mactan Resort & Spa is a 5-star resort owned by Shangri-La Hotels and Resorts located on the island of Mactan, Cebu, Philippines. The hotel measures 13 hectares, has 530 guest rooms and suites, a 6-hole golf course, two outdoor swimming pools, a private man-made beach cove, and a 6-hectare marine sanctuary with over 100 kinds of fish and corals..

Shangri-La's Mactan Resort and Spa received the “ASEAN Green Hotel Standard” at the ASEAN Tourism Forum 2008 held in Bangkok, Thailand, in recognition of its environmentally friendly energy conservation measures. For its 20th anniversary in October 2013, the resort underwent an expansive renovation program over three phases with a new “ocean to shore” concept.

Since it opened in 1993, Shangri-La's Mactan Resort and Spa has won awards from international institutions such as "AsiaMoney", Business Traveller, Conde Nast, HotelClub.com, Smart Travel Asia, Time magazine, Travel Weekly (for “Best Spa”) and Zagat World's Top Hotels, Resorts and Spas.

History 

The Shangri-La's Mactan Resort & Spa was opened by Wolf Dieter Flecker on October 23, 1993. When it first opened, the resort was significantly smaller than it is today, when "the view of the seas [were] unobstructed." Additions over the years have included the Ocean Wing and fish sanctuary, as well as palm trees and lagoon pools.

In 2007 the resort announced a multimillion-dollar renovation program to coincide with the hosting of the 14th ASEAN summit on its premises. 188 rooms in the Ocean Wing were renovated, while a marquee able to accommodate 1,000 guests was also added.

A renewal program over three phases from 2012 to 2013 included new room types, existing room makeovers and a new theme, at a cost of P718 million (US$16.5 million).

The resort remains particularly popular with tourists from Korea and Japan, but with an increasing number of domestic guests. It also hosts major international events, including the Miss Universe pre-pageant, the APEC summit, and the ASEAN Leader's Summit.

Theme 

During the resort's refurbishment for its 20th anniversary, a new theme, "ocean to shore," was announced. The resort maintains this concept in part through its own beachfront sanctuary, which was first launched in 2007. Spanning six hectares, the Shangri-La Marine Sanctuary contains 160 species of fish, clams and coral, as well as two sunken ships placed there to form artificial coral. Staff of the hotel maintain the sanctuary alongside steward partners Amores Charities, Inc., Scotty's Action Sports Network and the Government of Lapu-Lapu City.

Design and construction 

The resort was designed by Francisco Mañosa and Partners, who had the responsibility of creating the first resort of the chain in the Philippines. The concept “called for a structure nestled in nature,” and Mañosa decided to have the facades of the hotel slope to avoid the structure feeling too monumental amongst the coconut palms.

Interior design was developed by Dale Keller & Associates. The in-room teak and mother-of-pearl furniture and decor use Philippine craftsmanship, applied on capiz headboards, timber flooring and decorative fretwork lamps.

Landscaping was developed by Belt Collins International (HK) Limited. The shoreline itself was reconfigured to create a sheltered, man-made beach with a “naturalistic island within wading distance.” Palm trees were planted in clusters with curved paths leading from the resort's main building to the beach, via tropical gardens and lawns.

Features

Rooms and suites

The resort has 530 rooms split into two wings, the Main and Ocean Wings. Ocean Club floor rooms also include personal concierge service and access to the Ocean Club Lounge.

A total of 354 rooms were refurbished in the resort's main wing during the 3-phase renovation program.

Restaurants 

The resort holds four specialty restaurants, as well as bars and Lobby Lounge.

CHI, The Spa 

CHI Spa Village opened in June 2005, with six private villas of 135 square meters, pavilions for treatments, and garden suites. The Spa Village extends over 10,000 square meters, containing herbal steam rooms and a spa pool.

Awards
The property is a mainstay of recommendation lists by major media like Conde Nast Traveler, 
Expedia, Asia Money and TIME magazine, winning awards each year. It was voted "The Favorite Resort Hotel in Asia" for three consecutive years from 2004 by TIME magazine's readers.

 Best Asia Hotel in the Philippines, Travel + Leisure "T+L 500" (USA), 2010
 Asia's Leading Beach Resort, World Travel Awards, 2009
 Asean Green Hotel Award, 2008
 Philippines’ Leading Resort, World Travel Awards, 2006

See also 
 Shangri-La Hotels and Resorts

References

Shangri-La Hotels and Resorts
Hotels in Cebu
Hotels established in 1993
Resorts in the Philippines
1993 establishments in the Philippines
Buildings and structures in Lapu-Lapu City
Tourist attractions in Cebu